"So I Can Have You Back" is a song by American R&B singer Joe. It was written by Gerald Isaac, Derek "D.O.A." Allen, and Phillip "Taj" Jackson for his twelfth studio album My Name Is Joe Thomas, while production was helmed by Isaac and Allen. Released as the album's lead single, it peaked at number one on the US Billboard Adult R&B Songs chart, becoming his fourth single to do so.

Charts

References

2016 singles
2016 songs
Joe (singer) songs